Cherokee  is a census-designated place (CDP) in Swain and Jackson counties in Western North Carolina, United States, within the Qualla Boundary land trust. Cherokee is located in the Oconaluftee River Valley around the intersection of U.S. Routes 19 and 441. As of the 2020 census, the CDP had a population of 2,195. It is the capital of the federally recognized Eastern Band of Cherokee Indians, one of three recognized Cherokee tribes and the only one in North Carolina.

The community also serves as a tourist destination, with numerous campgrounds, motels, and hotels serving visitors to the Great Smoky Mountains National Park, with a major entrance to the park lying within the community.  Cherokee serves as the southern terminus of the Blue Ridge Parkway.  The Oconaluftee River serves as a major water sports destination, and the Oconaluftee Indian Village, a living-history museum, hosts the popular outdoor drama Unto These Hills.

History
Cherokee is the capital of the Eastern Band of the Cherokee Nation and part of the traditional homelands of the Cherokee people. In the 1870s, the Eastern Band purchased the land for what is called the "Qualla Boundary". To continue the heritage of the Cherokee in the town, several signs for Cherokee's streets and buildings are written in both Cherokee syllabary and English. As a census-designated place (CDP), Cherokee overlaps most or part of three of the seven communities of the Qualla Boundary: Painttown, Wolftown, and Yellowhill.

Geography
Cherokee town and its surrounding Qualla Boundary is in the very mountainous Swain and Jackson counties. The highest elevation is  Clingman's Dome at the border with Tennessee. Clingman's Dome is the highest point in the Great Smoky Mountains National Park. The Oconaluftee River flows through downtown Cherokee.

Demographics

2020 census

As of the 2020 United States census, there were 2,195 people, 867 households, and 561 families residing in the CDP.

Climate

Economy
The EBCI negotiated an agreement with the state, and in 1997 opened Harrah's Cherokee Casino for gaming. It has generated jobs and revenue for the tribe, providing money that the EBCI applies to its people's education, welfare and culture. In 2005, nearly four million people visited the casino and generated a per capita profit of roughly $8,000 annually. Each member of the tribe is paid some annual income; the tribe reinvests other monies for health and related services, and long-term development.

Since the late 20th century, most manufacturing and textile plants left the area, moving their jobs offshore to lower wage areas, such as Southeast Asia. The regional economy suffered. Many of the Cherokee had to rely on jobs related to national park tourism and recreation, which provided work for about half of the year. Many tribal members had to rely on public assistance to survive during the winter.

Tourism
Cherokee is a tourist-oriented area, located at the entrance to Great Smoky Mountains National Park and at the southern end of the Blue Ridge Parkway.  In addition to the casino, it is the site of attractions such as: 
 Cherokee Botanical Garden and Nature Trail
 Trail to Mount Guyot
 Museum of the Cherokee Indian
 Oconaluftee Indian Village
 Oconaluftee (Great Smoky Mountains)
 Qualla Arts & Crafts Mutual
 Oconaluftee River

Eastern Cherokee history, culture, and crafts are portrayed in the historical drama Unto These Hills, presented annually during the tourist season. 

The Cherokee area offers many campgrounds, trails and river adventures. It is also home to three roadside attractions with zoos: Cherokee Bear Zoo, Chief Saunooke Bear Park, and Santa's Land.

The zoos have been considered controversial. Bob Barker, a retired game show host and animal rights activist, has called for closing the black bear zoos at these attractions.

Cherokee Wonderland and Frontier Land were two amusement parks that operated in the area in the late 1960s and into the early 21st century, respectively. The latter was converted into a water park before being closed to make way for development of Harrah's Cherokee.  When they were open, both parks featured their own  narrow gauge railroads (named Cherokee Wonderland Railroad and Frontier Land Railroad).

Notable people
Walker Calhoun, musician, dancer, and teacher
Amanda Crowe, woodcarver and educator
Raymond Fairchild, banjo player
Charles George, Medal of Honor recipient
Leon Miller, American football player and lacrosse coach
Clyde Moody, bluegrass musician
Stan Powell, NFL player for the Oorang Indians
William Holland Thomas, Cherokee leader and Confederate general

Education
Cherokee Central Schools operates the K–12 public schools. Cherokee High School is the local high school.

The private elementary school, New Kituwah Academy, is based on language immersion in Cherokee.

Previously the Bureau of Indian Affairs (BIA) provided educational services, and in their schools students were not permitted to speak Cherokee.

Popular culture 
Scenes from movies such as Davy Crockett, King of the Wild Frontier, Digging to China, Forces of Nature, The Fugitive, and Stroszek were shot in Cherokee.

Media
The Cherokee One Feather newspaper has served the community for decades.

References

External links

 Cherokee Tourism website
 2009 Boundary and Annexation Survey, a U.S. Census map for Cherokee and the surrounding area 
The argument for a basic income

Census-designated places in Jackson County, North Carolina
Census-designated places in North Carolina
Census-designated places in Swain County, North Carolina
Cherokee towns in North Carolina
Communities of the Great Smoky Mountains
Eastern Band of Cherokee Indians
Tourism in North Carolina